Gradyn Bowd (born 27 August 1992) is a Canadian rugby union player, currently playing for . His preferred position is fly-half.

Early career
Bowd is from Red Deer, Alberta and played a multitude of sports as a young athlete before studying at the University of Victoria where he captained the rugby team for four seasons.

Bowd has played for a number of clubs in Canada, and played in Australia for Sunnybank in Brisbane.

Professional career
Bowd signed for Old Glory DC, his first experience of full-time professional rugby, ahead of the 2023 Major League Rugby season.

Bowd made his international debut for Canada in 2016, against Uruguay. He would go on to win a further 7 caps, but would then not feature again for the side until 2022 when he was called up to the squad for the 2022 end-of-year rugby union internationals.

References

External links
itsrugby.co.uk Profile

1992 births
Living people
Canadian rugby union players
Canada international rugby union players
Rugby union fly-halves
Old Glory DC players